Zahedan Mixed Passenger is an international mixed passenger train and freight train operated twice-a-month by Pakistan Railways between Quetta, Pakistan and Zahedan, Iran. The train named after the Iranian city of Zahedan and runs on the 1st and 15th every month from Quetta to Zahedan, and the 3rd and 17th of each month from Zahedan to Quetta.

This train doesn't run any more, but there are talks to start it again.

Route
 Quetta–Zahedan via Quetta–Taftan Railway Line

Station stops

Equipment
The train has economy accommodations only.

See also
Gul Train
Quetta Railway Station

References

Named passenger trains of Pakistan
International named passenger trains
Rail transport in Iran
Iran–Pakistan border